The 1898 Michigan gubernatorial election was held on November 1, 1898. Incumbent Republican Hazen S. Pingree defeated Fusion candidate of the Democratic, People's, and Union Silver parties, Justin R. Whiting, with 57.75% of the vote.

General election

Candidates
Major party candidates
Hazen S. Pingree, Republican
Justin R. Whiting, Democratic

Other candidates
Noah W. Cheever, Prohibition
Sullivan W. Cook, People's
George Hasseler, Socialist Labor

Results

References

Notes

1898
Michigan
Gubernatorial
November 1898 events